Wikstroemia alternifolia is a shrub, of the family Thymelaeaceae.  It is native to China, specifically Gansu and northern Sichuan.

Description
The shrub has white pale branches. It is found on open bushy slopes and rocks at altitudes under 2500 m.

References

alternifolia